Governor Rogers may refer to:

Clifford Joy Rogers (1897–1962), 22nd Governor of Wyoming
Daniel Rogers (politician) (1754–1806), 12th Governor of Delaware
John Rankin Rogers (1838–1901), 3rd Governor of Washington
Richard Reid Rogers (1867–1949), 3rd Military Governor of Panama Canal Zone
Woodes Rogers (1679–1732), Royal Governor of the Bahamas from 1718 to 1721